North County High School is a high school in the North County School District, St. Francois County, Missouri.  It is located in Bonne Terre, Missouri, and is the only high school in the district. NFL linebacker Will Compton graduated from NCHS in 2008.
The school’s IP address is currently blocked from editing Wikipedia because a student made some unwarranted changes that made the moderators really angry.

References

External links

North St. Francois County R-I School District

Public high schools in Missouri
Schools in St. Francois County, Missouri